Epidote Peak is a 10,964-foot-elevation (3,342 meter) mountain summit located in the Sierra Nevada mountain range, in Mono County of northern California, United States. The mountain is set in the Hoover Wilderness on land managed by Humboldt–Toiyabe National Forest. The first ascent of Epidote Peak was made by several Sierra Club members in 1917. This landform's toponym, which refers to the greenish mineral epidote present here, has been officially adopted by the United States Board on Geographic Names, and has been in print since at least 1919.

Climate
Epidote Peak is located in an alpine climate zone. Most weather fronts originate in the Pacific Ocean, and travel east toward the Sierra Nevada mountains. As fronts approach, they are forced upward by the peaks  (orographic lift), causing moisture in the form of rain or snowfall to drop onto the range. Precipitation runoff from this mountain drains into headwaters of the East and West Forks of Green Creek, which is a tributary of the Walker River.

See also

 Gabbro Peak

Gallery

References

External links
 Weather forecast: Epidote Peak

Mountains of Mono County, California
North American 3000 m summits
Mountains of Northern California
Sierra Nevada (United States)
Humboldt–Toiyabe National Forest